Applegreen is an Irish company founded in 1992 that operates 620 petrol stations in Ireland, the UK and the US. It is a major petrol retailer in Ireland, and operates convenience stores and motorway service areas. Applegreen's headquarters are based in Park West Business Park in Dublin, Ireland.

In 2018, Applegreen purchased the majority of UK motorway service area operator Welcome Break for €361.8m. In 2021, Applegreen acquired the United States toll road service area operations from HMSHost for $375 million.

Greenwashing controversies 
In 2020, Applegreen announced an initiative to offset the emissions from its premium fuels, which has been labelled as a greenwashing effort. While the campaign claimed to offset all the emissions from its fuels, a report from IrishEVs showed that this only included emissions created from cars and did not include emissions from extraction or refinement which typically account for up to 40% of the total greenhouse gas emissions from petrol and diesel.

In February 2022, Applegreen created an education initiative, called Biodive, to educate students on climate change. It encouraged increased spending on fossil fuel products so that children could win rewards for their school, while the education material itself focused on low-impact biodiversity projects and overlooked the role of fossil fuels in worsening the climate crisis.

Partnership with Marks & Spencer 
In October 2022, Applegreen announced a partnership with Marks & Spencer to sell M&S Food in its locations in Ireland. A new M&S Food “shop-in-shop” will initially be available in five Applegreen locations.

Creeslough explosion 

On 7 October 2022, an explosion occurred at an Applegreen petrol station in the village of Creeslough, County Donegal. The explosion killed ten people and left eight hospitalised. The site housed a petrol station, a supermarket, a post office, a hair dressing salon, and an apartment building. The source of the explosion has not yet been identified, but investigators suspect that it was caused by an accidental gas leak in the apartment building behind the petrol station. The Gardai (Irish police) are continuing to investigate the cause, but it is reportedly "strongly suspected" that a gas leak caused the explosion in the apartment block beside the petrol station. The explosion caused the region's largest number of civilian casualties in decades.

References

External links

Automotive fuel retailers
Oil companies of the Republic of Ireland
Energy companies established in 1992
Non-renewable resource companies established in 1992
Retail companies established in 1992
1992 establishments in Ireland
Irish brands
Filling stations in the United Kingdom
Companies listed on Euronext Dublin